The 2013 ICC World Cricket League Division Seven was a cricket tournament that took place from 6 to 13 April 2013. It formed part of the ICC World Cricket League and qualifying for the 2019 Cricket World Cup. Botswana hosted the event.

Teams
The teams that took part in the tournament were decided according to the results of the 2011 ICC World Cricket League Division Seven, the 2011 ICC World Cricket League Division Six and the 2012 ICC World Cricket League Division Eight.

Squads

Fixtures

Round robin

Points table

Matches

Playoffs

5th place playoff

3rd place playoff

Final

Statistics

Most runs
The top five highest run scorers (total runs) are included in this table.

Most wickets
The following table contains the five leading wicket-takers.

Final Placings

After the conclusion of the tournament the teams were distributed as follows:

References

https://web.archive.org/web/20120406115546/http://icc-cricket.yahoo.net/newsdetails.php?newsId=13910_1302162060

2013, 7
Sports competitions in Botswana
Cricket in Botswana
2013 in cricket
2013 in Botswana sport
International sports competitions hosted by Botswana
Sport in Gaborone